The Hungarian Bridge Federation (Hungarian: Magyar Bridzs Szövetség - MBSZ) is the national organisation for bridge in Hungary. The chairman is Tibor Nádasi and the deputy chairman is Gábor Winkler. The headquarters are in Budapest. The Hungarian Bridge Federation is affiliated to the World Bridge Federation. The federation programs international tournaments for the bridge players from the country.

Organization

Board of directors

Working  
The federation is ruled by a chairman and a deputy chairman and a general secretary.

Current officers  
 chairman : Tibor Nádasi 
 deputy chairman : Gábor Winkler 
 general secretary :

See also 

 Hungary
 Contract bridge
 World Bridge Federation
 List of bridge federations

Site  
 A Magyar Bridzs Szövetség régi honlapja 
 A Magyar Bridzs Szövetség új honlapja 

Contract bridge governing bodies
Bridge